Păltinoasa is a commune located in Suceava County, Bukovina, northeastern Romania. It is composed of two villages, namely Capu Codrului and Păltinoasa.

Administration and local politics

Communal council 

The commune's current local council has the following political composition, according to the results of the 2020 Romanian local elections:

References 

Communes in Suceava County
Localities in Southern Bukovina
Polish communities in Romania